Baggage Battles was an American docu-reality, produced by The Travel Channel from 2012 until 2016. The first episode of the show was aired on April 11, 2012. Season 5 was produced in Canada for Travel Channel International and Canada's CMT Network.

Laurence and Sally Martin are also recurring appraisers on Storage Wars. William Leroy appeared once in Toy Hunter and Jordan Hembrough appeared three times on "Baggage Battles".

A spin-off focussing on William Leroy "Billy Buys Brooklyn", aired its first 20 episodes in 2021. Mark Meyer made an appearance in the first season.

Format
The program is related to lost baggage auctions, police auctions, and estate auctions. Season 5 features professional buyers Billy Leroy (a antique expert and dealer) who owned the famous Billy's Antiques on the Bowery in New York City, Val (a production designer and online store owner) and Mark Meyer (an eCommerce expert) traveling around North America searching for amazing finds to resell. Previous seasons of the series featured other buyers such as  Laurence and Sally Martin, and Traci Lombardo. They often call experts/appraisers to evaluate the objects they have bought. Leroy started filming his new series Billy Buys Brooklyn on August 6, 2020 for Discovery channel. It premiered on Discovery plus in the UK on June 16, 2021.

Seasons

Season 1

Season 2

Season 3

Season 4

Season 5

Critical reaction
The show is well received by the critics. It has received 7.4/10 ratings on TV.com and has received 2.3/10 ratings on TVGuide.co.uk. AV Club found it derivative of Storage Wars, but more positively said that the travel angle did add some local color and occasionally it did surprise with what the participants found.

International distribution
: On Travel Channel Albania HD 
: On A&E Australia and 7mate
: On Travel & Living Channel
 : On Travel Channel Bulgaria and Discovery Channel Bulgaria
: OLN, DTour, CMT Canada
: On Discovery Channel Croatia
: On Discovery Channel France
: On DMAX Germany and TLC Germany
: On Lifetime (South East Asia), under the name "行李大戰(Baggage Wars)"
: On History TV18
: On DMAX Italia and Fine Living, under the name Affari in valigia
: on Travel Channel Ireland and Discovery Channel Ireland
: On Travel Channel HD (Asia), under the name "行李戰爭(Baggage Wars)"
: On Lifetime Channel
: On Discovery Channel Malta and Travel Channel Malta
: On Discovery Channel Norway
: On Discovery Channel Poland, under the name Walka o Bagaż.
: On Travel Channel Serbia
: On Discovery Channel Spain under the name "Perdido, Vendido"
: On Discovery Channel Sweden
: On SRF zwei
: On Discovery Channel Netherlands
: On Travel Channel UK and Discovery Channel UK

References

External links

 

2010s American reality television series
2012 American television series debuts
2016 American television series endings
Auction television series